PARM1, or Prostate androgen-regulated mucin-like protein 1, is a human gene.

References

Further reading